Annaba ( "Place of the Jujubes"), formerly known as Bon, Bona and Bône, is a seaport city in the northeastern corner of Algeria, close to the border with Tunisia. Annaba is near the small Seybouse River and is in the Annaba Province. With a population of about 464,740 (2019) and 1,000,000 for the metropole, Annaba is the third-largest city and the leading industrial center in Algeria.

Annaba is a coastal city that underwent significant growth during the 20th century. Annaba has a metropolitan area with a higher population density than the other metropolitan areas of the Algerian coastline, such as Oran and Algiers. Much of eastern and southern Algeria uses the services, equipment and infrastructure of Annaba. Economically, it is the centre for various economic activities, such as industry, transportation, finance, and tourism.

Names
Present-day Annaba grew up on the site of Aphrodisium, the seaport of the Roman city . (The modern city has since expanded south over Hippo's ruins as well.) Its former names Bône and Bona derived from "Ubbo", a local form of the name Hippo. Its informal name "Land of the Jujubes" (Balad al-‘Unnāb) derives from that abundance of that fruit in the region.

History

Ancient 
The area of Annaba has yielded evidence of very early human occupation at Ain el Hanech, near Saïda (circa 200,000 BC), including artifacts that show remarkable toolmaking craftsmanship. According to some sources, prehistoric Algeria was the site of the most advanced development of flake-tool techniques in the Middle Early Stone Age (Middle Paleolithic).

The town of Hippo Regius (modern Annaba) first entered historical records at the end of the 3rd century BCE as a possession of Massinissa’s Numidian Kingdom. Augustine of Hippo was bishop here from 396 AD until his death in 430 AD. The city was destroyed in the 5th century by the Vandals. Vandals ruled the city for roughly a century until 534. Gelimer, the King of the Vandals and Alans from 530 to 534 AD, faced with the starvation of his followers and their children, and realizing he had no chance of regaining his kingdom of North Africa, surrendered to Flavius Belisarius, a general of the Byzantine Empire under Justinian I, at Bône. Byzantines then ruled Hippona (Hippo's renamed name after 395) before the Muslim conquest of the Maghreb in 699 AD. Later, Abbasids, Aghlabids, and Fatimids ruled Bona before the rise of the Zirids. It was relocated to its present place after flooding and Banu Hilal the ravages that occurred in 1033 during Hammadid rule. It was attacked by a Pisan fleet in 1034 and was conquered by Kingdom of Sicily in 1153. The Almohads took it in 1160.

During the 11th century, the Banu Hilal, an Arab tribe living between the Nile and the Red Sea, settled in Tunisia, Tripolitania (western Libya) and Constantinois (eastern Algeria) which was the portion known as Annaba.

After the demise of the Almohads, the rule of the Hafsids began in Annaba in 1250. Hafsid rule was interrupted by brief occupations of the Marinids and Castile (in 1360) and ended with that of the Zayyanids. Rule by the Ottoman Empire began in 1533, and that lasted until French occupation in 1832, excepting rule by the Spanish Empire between 1535 and 1540. The Barbary pirates also lived in Annaba from the 16th through 19th centuries.

Modern 
During the rule of France (empire and republics), this city was called Bône. It was one of the main French settlements, and it still has a sizeable minority of the "Pied-Noir". One notable pied-noir from Bône was General Alphonse Juin, a Marshal of France and then the Central European NATO Commander.

Construction was undertaken at Bône during 1856–69 to build an  sheltered port to handle the iron ore from the Mokta el Hadid.
A short railroad line was built from the iron ore mine at Ain Mokra to the docks of Bône. This railway was opened in 1864, the first one to be built in Algeria. Full-scale production or iron ore began in 1865. Also in 1865, Emperor Napoleon III visited Algeria, including going to the mine and the city of Bône.

In 1865, the mine produced 22,000 tonnes of iron ore, which increased to 255,000 tonnes in 1869. The ore was extracted from underground galleries, and then shipped from Bône to the French iron and steel works. Before the mine was opened, Bône had just 10,000 inhabitants. By 1924, there were 41,000 people, and the port was being used to export phosphates, lead ore, and zinc ore, too.

During World War II in 1943, Bône was an important goal of the U.S. Army and British Army in Operation Torch, advancing eastward from Morocco, Oran, and Algiers across North Africa. Bône was a crucial highway and sea location for the invasion of Tunisia, and thence the driving of the Axis Powers (Germany and Italy) out of Africa in May 1943.

Bône remained in Allied hands until the end of the war in 1945, and then it remained a part of French Algeria until the independence of Algeria in 1962.

Demography

The city of Annaba had a population of 257,359 in 2008 (General Census of the population and habitat). In 1988, the population of the urban district of Annaba had increased to 359,657 (with El Bouni comprising 111,956 inhabitants). The cities of If El Hadjar, and Sidi Amar are also included. Currently there are approximately 500,000 people in "greater Annaba". Today  Annaba has a population of 464.740 and 1.000.000 in greater Annaba.

Urban areas
The metropolitan area includes the cities of El Bouni, El Hadjar and Sidi Amar, which now form a circle around the city of Annaba. The city has grown dramatically since a major factory was opened at El Hadjar ( to the South) and provides employment for the entire region.

The downtown district of Annaba is on the sea-front, and includes the promenade called the Concours de la Revolution (previously called Le Cours Bertagna) which is a lively area, brimming with arcades and all kinds of covered restaurants, terraced cafes and kiosks. Annaba also has an international airport.

Climate
Annaba has a hot-summer Mediterranean climate (Csa in the Köppen climate classification) with long, hot, dry summers, especially from mid-July to mid-August, and mild, wet winters. Snow is rare but not unknown. Rain is abundant by North African standards and can be torrential.

Education
One of Annaba's most notable educational institutions is the University of Annaba. As of 2004, there are over 40,000 students enrolled.

There is a branch campus of the French international school Lycée international Alexandre-Dumas.

Economy

As of 1911, Annaba was producing iron, zinc, cork, livestock, and cereal.

It is the largest in Africa. Phosphate and metal industries now include the Seybousa complex and the metallurgical complex of Allelik. The private industrial sector is also very important in Annaba and geared especially to the agri-food, metal processing, wood products and construction. Business areas are also to be found in the suburbs of the city, such as Sidi Salem, El Eulma and Wadi El-Aneb.

Transportation
Annaba was described as the "chief seaport of Algeria after Oran and Algiers," by Baedeker's in 1911.

Annaba is served by Rabah Bitat Airport, an international airport whose IATA airport code is AAE. Annaba also has rail links to the Algerian cities of Constantine and Algiers, and it is at the end of Algeria's east–west highway. It is the second industrial centre in Algeria after the capital Algiers.

Tourism

Annaba is an important centre for tourism, and is one of the major tourist attractions in the western Mediterranean. It is a coastal city with mountains, hills, foothills, and plains surrounding it. Due to this, and aside from maritime and seaside tourism, Annaba has a key potential for mountain tourism. Other tourist attractions are West Bay, Djenane el Bey (La Grande Plage), Ras el Hamra and Ain Achir beach.

Annaba also has various key religious sites, including the Saint Augustin Basilica. Annaba in its early history, was the site of an important and influential Diocese, prior to its destruction by the Vandals, and the era of Islamisation. Annaba is located on the Tunisian border, and is a visa-free area, hence tourists are also able to make side trips to Tunisia and to El Kala National Park.

Annaba is also known for its verdant Main Street (more often known as the Concours de la Revolution), which is a bustling promenade also well known for its night-life. The Annaba area is generally reputed for having scenic beaches, hotels and a bustling nightlife.

It is an important memorial to the British Empire's soldiers and airmen who fought in the region during the World War II, with 868 Commonwealth burials there. There are also 14 other graves, mostly of merchant seamen. It was designed by J. Hubert Worthington. After the war, most of the American dead were repatriated for burial in the United States, but this was not traditional in the British Empire.

Notable people 
Juba I of Numidia, Berber king of Numidia and Mauretania.
Juba II Son of Juba I, king of Numidia and spouse of Cleopatra Selene II
 Augustine of Hippo, also known as Saint Augustine, Bishop of Hippo Regius (present-day Annaba).
 Ahmad al-Buni, born in Bône (now Annaba), died 1225, a well-known Sufi and writer on the esoteric value of letters and topics relating to mathematics, sihr (sorcery) and spirituality. His complete name is Sharaf al-Din or Shihab al-Din Ahmad ibn Ali ibn Yusuf al-Buni al-Maliki al-Amazighi.
 Alphonse Juin, born in Bône, was a French pied-noir general during World Wars I & II.
 Edwige Fenech, born in Bône, is an Italian actress.
 Mohamed Boudiaf, Algerian president, was assassinated in Annaba in 1992.
 Robert Cohen, born in Bône, was a French boxer.
 Professor Alain Ferry (born 1939), a writer, who was awarded the 2009 Prix Médicis.
 Michèle Victory (born 1958), French politician

In Art and Literature
 An engraving of a painting by J Salmon,  was published in Fisher's Drawing Room Scrap Book, 1837 along with a poetical illustration by Letitia Elizabeth Landon entitled Bona, The Pirate's Song.

See also

 European enclaves in North Africa before 1830
 Edough Massif

Notes

Sources

External links

  Annaba City
  Annaba

 
Communes of Annaba Province
Mediterranean port cities and towns in Algeria
Coastal cities in Algeria
Province seats of Algeria